Dalla cyprius is a species of butterfly in the family Hesperiidae. It is found in Bolivia and Peru.

Subspecies
Dalla cyprius cyprius - Bolivia
Dalla cyprius quinka Evans, 1955 - Peru

References

Butterflies described in 1898
cyprius
Hesperiidae of South America
Taxa named by Paul Mabille